Abu Sokheyr (also Romanized as Abū Sokheyr; also known as Ābsokheyr, Abū os Khéīr, Oboskher, and Tābān) is a village in Darkhoveyn Rural District, in the Central District of Shadegan County, Khuzestan Province, Iran. At the 2006 census, its population was 702, in 106 families.

References 

Populated places in Shadegan County